The Blau is a  river in Baden-Württemberg, southern Germany, and a left tributary of the Danube. The source of the Blau is the karst spring of Blautopf, in the town Blaubeuren, in the Swabian Jura. It flows east through Blaustein to the city of Ulm, where it empties into the Danube.

Blau valley 

The valley of the Blau was formed by the Danube. When the Swabian Jura rose, the Danube initially incised a deeper and deeper valley but finally chose a course to the southwest. In the valley it left behind today, the Schmiech river flows south meeting the Danube in Ehingen (Donau), whereas the Blau flows east towards Ulm.

References

Rivers of Baden-Württemberg
Rivers of Germany